During 2017, tropical cyclones formed within seven different tropical cyclone basins, located within various parts of the Atlantic, Pacific and Indian Oceans. During the year, a total of 146 tropical cyclones had formed. 88 tropical cyclones had been named by either a Regional Specialized Meteorological Center (RSMC) or a Tropical Cyclone Warning Center (TCWC).

The most active basin in the year was the Western Pacific, which documented 27 named systems. However, the season was a slightly below-average season and the first since 1977 season saw no Category 5-equivalent super typhoon. The Eastern Pacific, despite amounting to 18 named systems, also was a was significantly less active than the previous three Pacific hurricane seasons (2014, 2015 and 2016). However, the North Atlantic hurricane featured 17 named storms, and was the costliest tropical cyclone season on record. It also had the fifth-most named storms since reliable records began in 1851 – tied with 1936 – and the most major hurricanes since 2005. The Australian region season experienced the average number of cyclones reaching tropical storm intensity, numbering 11, respectively. Activity across the southern hemisphere's three basins—South-West Indian, Australian, and South Pacific—was spread evenly, with each region recording seven named storms apiece. Three Category 5 tropical cyclones formed during the year.

The strongest and deadliest tropical cyclone was Hurricane Maria with a minimum barometric pressure of 908 mbar (hPa) and killing 3,000 people in Puerto Rico and Dominica. The costliest tropical cyclone of the year was Hurricane Harvey in the Atlantic, which struck Houston metropolitan area in August causing US$125 billion in damage, tying with Hurricane Katrina as the costliest tropical cyclone worldwide.

Global atmospheric and hydrological conditions

For the majority of the year, the tropics were dominated by neutral El Niño–Southern Oscillation (ENSO) conditions, before La Niña conditions set in later in the year. As the year opened, sea surface temperatures anomalies across the central and east-central equatorial Pacific were cooler than average, while the impacts of La Niña lingered within the atmospheric circulation, following an abrupt end to the 2016 La Niña episode. Over the next few months, these anomalies warmed and nearly reached the thresholds needed for an El Niño event to be declared, however, they subsequently cooled throughout the rest of the year and the 2017–18 La Niña event was declared to be underway.

Scientists pointed out that the increase of  emissions contributes to warmer ocean waters and more moist air for rain. Because of sea level rise it is assumed that the storm surge of Hurricane Irma and other storms will cause greater flooding to vulnerable areas. Data collected by NASA showed that ocean surface temperatures in the path of Irma were above 30 °C (86 °F), capable of sustaining a Category 5 hurricane.
Prior to affecting the U.S. mainland, Miami's mayor Tomás Regalado noted on Hurricane Irma, "This is the time to talk about climate change. This is the time that the president and the EPA and whoever makes decisions needs to talk about climate change." A day later the head of the EPA, Scott Pruitt said, "..to discuss the cause and effect of these storms, there's the… place (and time) to do that, it's not now." Following Irma's landfall, Donald Trump was asked about the connection between hurricanes and climate change, and stated that "We’ve had bigger storms than this." Richard Branson who was directly impacted by hurricane Irma noted, "..hurricanes are the start of things to come. Look, climate change is real. Ninety-nine per cent of scientists know it's real. The whole world knows it's real except for maybe one person in the White House."

United Nations secretary general António Guterres citing the devastation from hurricanes noted in September, "The catastrophic Atlantic hurricane season has been made worse by climate change. Cutting carbon emissions must clearly be part of our response to the disaster. The rise in the surface temperature of the ocean has had an impact on weather patterns and we must do everything possible to bring it down."

The Associated Press looked at the yearly average accumulated cyclone energy (ACE), which accounts for wind speed and storm duration to assess hurricane power of the past 30 years and found it to be 41 percent higher than the previous 30 years. They asked several experts about their opinion, James Kossin from NOAA "There's no question that the storms are stronger than they were 30 years ago." Climate scientist Stefan Rahmstorf of the Potsdam Institute for Climate Impact Research, "The only caveat being that the increase might be exaggerated somewhat because of undercounting early storms." Meteorologist Philip Klotzbach noted, "What's happening with hurricanes — the frequency, the duration, and the energy — is probably a combination of factors caused by both nature and man, a mish-mosh of everything." Kerry Emanuel who studies hurricanes, told the BBC, "The warming of the climate has increased the underlying probabilities of very heavy rain events like happened in Harvey and very high category hurricanes like Irma. It is just not sensible to say either storm was caused by climate change, but the underlying probabilities are going up."

Summary

North Atlantic Ocean 

The Atlantic basin was hyperactive with 17 named storms, 10 consecutive hurricanes, and 6 major hurricanes. It was also the second consecutive above-average season since 2016 and the costliest season on record. Most of the damage was caused by hurricanes Harvey, Irma, and Maria. Hurricane Nate was considered the worst natural disaster in Costa Rican history. Due to the damage that the four hurricanes made, the names Harvey, Irma, Maria, and Nate were retired by the WMO after the season. 

The first named storm, Arlene, formed on April 19 as a subtropical depression. When Arlene was named on April 20, it became only the second named storm to form in April, the other being Ana in 2003 and the strongest tropical cyclone on record in April. No storms formed in May.

Throughout June and July, activity increased with Tropical Storms Bret, Cindy, Don, and Emily and Tropical Depression Four. However, most storms were weak or short-lived and resulted in the lowest ACE for the first five named storms on record, surpassing 1988. 

In August, Hurricanes Franklin, Gert, Harvey, and Irma formed with the latter two causing catastrophic damage to the contiguous United States. Hurricane Harvey caused catastrophic flooding and was tied the costliest hurricane on record along with Hurricane Katrina in 2005. Hurricane Irma caused a trail of damage from the Leeward Islands to Florida, causing $77.2 billion in damage, and became the first Category 5 hurricane to make landfall in the Leeward Islands.

In September, copious activity occurred with Hurricanes Jose, Katia, Lee, and Maria, with the latter becoming the tenth most intense hurricane on record. Hurricane Maria caused catastrophic damage to Puerto Rico and Dominica with over 3,000 fatalities and $91.606 billion in damage. Accumulated cyclone energy also increased rapidly during this month, resulting in three hurricanes achieving an ACE over 40, the first on record to do so, September 8th becoming the most active day on record based on ACE, and Hurricane Irma achieving the third-highest ACE on record with 64.9 units. 

By October, activity still persisted although the potential for a La Niña would begin peaking by November. Hurricane Nate became the worst natural disaster in Costa Rican history as a precursor, while Ophelia became the worst tropical cyclone to affect Ireland in 50 years. Philippe was a short-lived system that contributed to a bomb cyclone shortly after its dissipation.

Finally, Tropical Storm Rina became the last storm to form in this basin, dissipating on November 9th. The extratropical remnants of this system later contributed to Cyclone Numa (or Storm Zenon), which affected Greece, Italy, France, Tunisia, and Turkey and caused the worst weather event in Greece since 1977. The season ended on November 30th.

Eastern & Central Pacific Oceans 

The 2017 Pacific hurricane season was a moderately active season with eighteen named storms, nine hurricanes, and four major hurricanes. Unlike the three previous hyperactive seasons (2014, 2015, and 2016), the season was significantly less active in terms of ACE and most storms that existed through this basin were either weak or short-lived. 

Early May saw the formation of Tropical Storm Adrian, which was the earliest named tropical cyclone to exist east of 140°W at the time; it was surpassed by Tropical Storm Andres in 2021.  Throughout June and July, the basin saw some considerable activity, with the latter month having the fifth-highest ACE in the Eastern Pacific.  Storms that existed during this time include Hurricanes Dora, Eugene, Fernanda, Hilary, Irwin, Tropical Storms Beatriz, Calvin, and Greg, and Tropical Depression Eight-E, which contributed to the ACE count throughout the earlier parts of the season.
Throughout August and September, activity decreased significantly, but stagnated in terms of named storms with some being short-lived. For example, in September, only four named storms formed (Otis, Max, Norma and Pilar) and October featured tropical storms Ramon and Selma, in which none attained hurricane status. Selma became the first named storm to make landfall in El Salvador  and also contributed to the formation of Philippe in the Atlantic. No storms have formed in November since 2010.

In the Central Pacific, no storms have formed since 2011. The season began on June 1st and both seasons ended on November 30th, 2017.

Western Pacific Ocean

North Indian Ocean

Systems

January

In January 2017, 12 storms formed. Tropical 14U, the strongest system this January 2017, affected the Northern Territory and the Western Australia. Surprisingly, 01W (Auring) formed in January 7 on the West Pacific and lasted until the 16th.

February

In February, 16 systems formed. Cyclone Dineo, one of the deadliest tropical cyclones on record in the South-West Indian Ocean and Southern Hemisphere, hit Mozambique and lasted from 13 February to 17th of the same month. On the West Pacific, Bising formed and lasted from 3rd – 7th of this month.

March

On March, 11 storms formed. Cyclone Enawo, was the strongest cyclone to strike Madagascar since Gafilo in 2004.

April

10 storms formed on April. One notable storm is Cyclone Ernie on Australian Region, is one of the quickest strengthening tropical cyclone on modern record. Crising also formed and affected Philippines in its lifespan.

May

5 systems formed on May. Tropical Storm Adrian, the earliest-known formation of a named storm in eastern Pacific proper, formed on May 9 and lasted until 10th of this month. Cyclone Donna also formed, which is the strongest Off-season South Pacific Cyclone on the month of May.

June

7 systems formed on this month. On this list is Tropical Storm Bret, a tropical storm from a low-latitude tropical wave that affected Trinidad and Tobago, Guyana, Venezuela, and Windward Islands., and Hurricane Dora (2017), that affected Southwestern Mexico. Also included is Severe Tropical Merbok from Western Pacific Ocean.

July

23 systems formed on the month of July, making it the busiest month of this year. On the West Pacific, Tropical Storm Nanmadol, Tropical Storm Talas, Typhoon Noru, Tropical Storm Kulap, Tropical Storm Sonca, Tropical Storm Roke (Fabian), Typhoon Nesat, Tropical Storm Haitang (Huaning) and Tropical Storm Nalgae formed. On the East Pacific, Hurricanes Eugene, Fernanda, Hilary and Irwin., a depression and Tropical Storm Greg formed. On the Atlantic, Tropical Storm Don, Tropical Storm Emily, and a weak depression formed. On the North Indian Ocean, two depressions formed.

August

15 storms formed in August 2017. Typhoon Banyan, Typhoon Hato, Tropical Storm Pakhar, Typhoon Sanvu, and Severe Tropical Storm Mawar formed on the West Pacific. On the Atlantic, Hurricane Franklin, Hurricane Gert, Hurricane Harvey, and Hurricane Irma formed. On the East Pacific, a weak depression, Tropical Storm Jova, Hurricane Kenneth and another tropical storm, Tropical Storm Lidia formed.

September

12 cyclones existed in September 2017. In the Western Pacific, Typhoons Talim and Doksuri, as well as Tropical Storm Guchol and Tropical Depression 22W (Nando) formed. In the Eastern Pacific, Hurricanes Otis, Max, Norma, and Tropical Storm Pilar existed during September. The strongest cyclone of September was Hurricane Maria, which was the second Category 5 hurricane to make landfall in the Atlantic in 2017. Hurricanes Jose, Katia, and Lee also existed in the Atlantic.

October

14 cyclones existed in October 2017. The strongest tropical cyclone in this month was Typhoon Lan, which was the third most intense tropical cyclone based on central pressure. Along with Lan, Tropical Depression 23W, Tropical Depressions 26W and 29W, Tropical Storm Saola, Typhoons Khanun, and Damrey existed in the Western Pacific. In the Atlantic, Hurricanes Nate, Ophelia, as well as Tropical Storm Philippe existed during the month. In the Eastern Pacific, Tropical Storms Ramon and Selma formed during the month. In the North Indian Ocean, Land Depression 02 and Depression BOB 05 formed during the month.

November

December

Global effects

See also

 Weather of 2017
 Tropical cyclones by year
 List of earthquakes in 2017
 Tornadoes of 2017
 2017 wildfire season

Notes

1 Only systems that formed either on or after January 1, 2017 are counted in the seasonal totals.
2 Only systems that formed either before or on December 31, 2017 are counted in the seasonal totals.3 The wind speeds for this tropical cyclone are based on the IMD Scale which uses 3-minute sustained winds.
4 The wind speeds for this tropical cyclone are based on the Saffir Simpson Scale which uses 1-minute sustained winds.

References

External links

Regional Specialized Meteorological Centers
 US National Hurricane Center – North Atlantic, Eastern Pacific
 Central Pacific Hurricane Center – Central Pacific
 Japan Meteorological Agency – NW Pacific
 India Meteorological Department – Bay of Bengal and the Arabian Sea
 Météo-France – La Reunion – South Indian Ocean from 30°E to 90°E
 Fiji Meteorological Service – South Pacific west of 160°E, north of 25° S

Tropical Cyclone Warning Centers
 Meteorology, Climatology, and Geophysical Agency of Indonesia – South Indian Ocean from 90°E to 141°E, generally north of 10°S
 Australian Bureau of Meteorology (TCWC's Perth, Darwin & Brisbane) – South Indian Ocean & South Pacific Ocean from 90°E to 160°E, generally south of 10°S
 Papua New Guinea National Weather Service – South Pacific Ocean from 141°E to 160°E, generally north of 10°S
 Meteorological Service of New Zealand Limited – South Pacific west of 160°E, south of 25°S

Tropical cyclones by year
2017 Atlantic hurricane season
2017 Pacific hurricane season
2017 Pacific typhoon season
2017 North Indian Ocean cyclone season
2016–17 Australian region cyclone season
2017–18 Australian region cyclone season
2016–17 South Pacific cyclone season
2017–18 South Pacific cyclone season
2016–17 South-West Indian Ocean cyclone season
2017–18 South-West Indian Ocean cyclone season